This is a list of franchise records for the Minnesota Wild of the National Hockey League. The franchise began play in the 2000-01 season and these records are updated through the 2021-22 season.

Career regular season records

Skaters

Goaltenders

Single season records

Skaters

Goaltenders

Career playoff records

Skaters

Single game

Regular

Skaters
Goals: Marián Gáborík, 5 (December 20, 2007)
Assists: Kevin Fiala, 5 (April 22, 2022)
Points: Marián Gáborík, 6 (twice - October 26, 2002, and December 20, 2007)
Penalty minutes: Stu Bickel, 39 (January 3, 2015)
Plus/minus: Jared Spurgeon, +5 (three times) - four other Wild skaters also have a +5 in a single game

Team records

Regular season
NHL playoff appearances: 11
Most games won, season: 53 (2021-22)
Most points in a single season: 113 (2021-22)
Longest winning streak: 12 games (2016-17)
Most games lost, season: 39 (2000-01)
Longest losing streak: 6 games (2013-14) 
Most goals scored, season: 283 and counting (2021-22)
Most goals scored, game: 8 (seven times) most recent March 15, 2023
Most goals scored, period: 6 (February 22, 2015)
Most assists, season: 465 and counting (2021-22)
Most player points, season: 743 and counting (2021-22)
Most player points, game: 24 (8 goals, 16 assists - February 27, 2018)
Most player points, period: 15 (6 goals, 9 assists - February 22, 2015)
Most penalties in minutes, season: 1189 (2005-06)
Most penalties in minutes, game: 57 (twice - March 2, 2002, and January 3, 2015)
Most penalties in minutes, period: 51 (January 3, 2015)
Hat tricks, franchise: 30
Hat tricks, season: 4 (2017-18)

See also
List of Minnesota Wild players
List of Minnesota Wild seasons

References

External links
Hockey-Reference – Minnesota Wild Franchise Index

Records
National Hockey League statistical records